The Women's 1,500 metres (T54) at the 2014 Commonwealth Games as part of the athletics programme was held at Hampden Park between 29 and 31 July 2014. The event was open to Para-sport wheelchair athletes competing under the T54 classification.

Results

First round
The first round consisted of two heats, with qualification to the finals for the first three in each heat and the four fastest losers over the two heats.

Heat 1

Heat 2

Final

References

Women's 1500 metres (T54)
2014 (T54)
2014 in women's athletics